The 2014 season is Warriors' 19th consecutive season in the top flight of Singapore football and in the S.League. Along with the S.League, the club will also compete in the Prime League, the Singapore Cup and the Singapore League Cup.

Squad

S.League squad

Prime League squad

Coaching staff

Transfers

Pre-season transfers

In

Out

Team statistics

Appearances and goals

Numbers in parentheses denote appearances as substitute.

Competitions

S.League

Singapore Cup

Singapore TNP League Cup

Group matches

Quarter-final

References

Warriors FC seasons
Singaporean football clubs 2014 season